Poqomam is a Mayan language, closely related to Poqomchiʼ. It is spoken by 50,000 or so people in several small pockets in Guatemala, the largest of which is in Jalapa department.

Distribution
Poqomam is spoken in the following municipalities of Escuintla, Jalapa, and Guatemala departments (Variación Dialectal en Poqom, 2000).

Guatemala
Chinautla
Mixco
Jalapa
San Luis Jilotepeque
San Pedro Pinula
San Carlos Alzatate
Escuintla
Palín

Linguistic Format
In the journal Natural Language & Linguistic Theory it is noted that if subjects are realized as negative indefinite pronouns, they may also trigger agent focus. The Mayan languages differ with respect to the degree of how obligation for agent focus. In this case Poqomam's agent focus is optional in all relevant contexts. 
An Example of Negative Indefinite Pronouns:

Translations
These are every day greetings from Poqomam, which is one of the Mayan languages of Guatemala. The translations are provided by the International Journal of American Linguistics:
Hello - Nqakʼul ta awach
Good Morning - Saqʼwa
Good Afternoon - Sanaqʼiij
Good Night - Qawaqʼaabʼ
How are you? - Qanke jat wilkaat 
How did you wake up? - Qanke xtisaqʼwa
Thank you - Tiyoox tii
Bye - Xahʼoo

Language Revitalization 
According to American Anthropologist, the revitalization of Mayan languages in Guatemala has increased in importance. In the 1996 Peace Accords the idea of officializing or co-officializing Mayan languages was introduced. Unfortunately in the 1999 referendum of the constitutional changes it was turned down. In May 2003, the Guatemala congress passed the "Law of National Languages" that, while it states that Spanish is the official language of Guatemala, the Law recognizes that indigenous languages are essential parts of the national identity which must be promoted. This is a considerable change from the Guatemalan Constitution, which only recognizes indigenous languages as a part of the "national patrimony."

The Mayans have taken a number of actions that are intended, in part, to address the problem of language status and language shift:
 The establishment of the Academia de Lenguas Mayas de Guatemala is an autonomous state institution directed by Mayas.
 The Academia's establishment of linguistic communities corresponds to the 21 Guatemalan Mayan languages.
 The finding of several NGOs will be devoted to linguistic research by Mayas.
 There will be an establishment of at least one foundation that addresses the community for language promotion.
 There will be an increment of numbers of Mayas who are involved in the Ministry of Education bilingual education programs.
 There will be an establishment of private "Maya schools" that will be intended to deliver appropriate education for Maya children.
 There will be an organization of nongovernmental associations to support the Maya schools.
 There will be an establishment of several Maya presses that promote publication in and about Mayan languages as well as other issues of concern.

References

External links 
Vocabulario de la lengua Pocomam de Mita, includes Pokonchi of San Cristobal Cajcaj
La Realidad Lingüística en Guatemala, History in the Mayan languages 
The Making of a Collection: Mesoamerican Manuscripts at Princeton University
A Tale of One City, Two Languages: Palín, Guatemala

Articles in class projects/Rutgers
Agglutinative languages
Mayan languages
Indigenous languages of Central America
Mesoamerican languages
Languages of Guatemala